Roddy Grant may refer to:

 Roddy Grant (footballer) (born 1966), English-born Scottish former professional footballer
 Roddy Grant (rugby union) (born 1987), rugby union player with Edinburgh and Scotland sevens